Jung Han-cheol (born 20 June 1996) is a South Korean footballer currently playing as a defender for Thai League 1 club Khon Kaen United.

Career statistics

Club

Notes

References

External links

1996 births
Living people
South Korean footballers
South Korean expatriate footballers
Association football defenders
J3 League players
Jung Han-cheol
FC Machida Zelvia players
YSCC Yokohama players
FC Imabari players
Jung Han-cheol
Jung Han-cheol
South Korean expatriate sportspeople in Japan
Expatriate footballers in Japan